The Seacow Head Light  is a lighthouse on the south-central coast of Prince Edward Island, Canada, west of Central Bedeque. It was built in 1864. The lighthouse was relocated in 1979 to avoid erosion. The lighthouse appeared in several episodes of the television series Road to Avonlea and was home to one of the series' main characters, Gus Pike.

The name "Seacow Head" was given in reference to the walrus, formerly abundant in nearby waters, and is not connected with Steller's Sea Cow or other Sirenia.

Keepers
 Malcolm MacFarlane 1865 – 1867 
 Thomas P. Huestis 1867 – 1872
 James Wright 1872 – 1873
 Peter O’Ronaghan (Ranahan)    1873 – 1917
 E. O’Ronaghan 1917 – 1919
 Thomas J. Ranahan 1919 – 1946
 Walter Richards 1946 - 1959
 William Sherry 1959 - 1967

See also
 List of lighthouses in Prince Edward Island
 List of lighthouses in Canada

References

External links
Picture of Seacow Head Light Lighthouse Friends
 Aids to Navigation Canadian Coast Guard

Lighthouses completed in 1864
Lighthouses in Prince Edward Island
Heritage sites in Prince Edward Island
Lighthouses on the Canadian Register of Historic Places
Buildings and structures in Summerside, Prince Edward Island